John Edward McLaughlin (born June 15, 1942) is an American intelligence official who served as Deputy Director of Central Intelligence and briefly as acting Director of Central Intelligence. He currently serves as a Senior Fellow and Distinguished Practitioner-in-Residence at the Philip Merrill Center for Strategic Studies at the Paul H. Nitze School of Advanced International Studies (SAIS) of the Johns Hopkins University.

Life and career

McLaughlin was born in McKeesport, Pennsylvania. In 1964, McLaughlin received a bachelor of arts degree from Wittenberg University in Springfield, Ohio. He was a member of the Beta Iota chapter of Delta Sigma Phi. He completed graduate work in comparative politics at the University of Pennsylvania. In 1966 he earned a master of arts degree in international relations from the Paul H. Nitze School of Advanced International Studies (SAIS) of the Johns Hopkins University. After graduating from SAIS, he served as a U.S. Army officer from 1966 to 1969, completing a tour in Vietnam from 1968 to 1969. In 2001, he returned to Wittenberg to speak at the commencement ceremony.

McLaughlin's CIA career lasted more than 30 years, starting in 1972 with a focus on European, Russian, and Eurasian issues at the Directorate of Intelligence. From 1984 to 1985, he served a rotational tour at the State Department in the Bureau of European and Canadian Affairs. He returned to CIA and served as Deputy Director and Director of the Office of European Analysis from 1985 to 1989; Director of Slavic and Eurasian Analysis from 1989 to 1995; Deputy Director for Intelligence, Vice Chairman for Estimates of the National Intelligence Council, and Acting Chairman of the National Intelligence Council from 1995 to 1997; and Deputy Director for Intelligence from 1997 to 2000.

While Deputy Director for Intelligence from 1997 to 2000, he created the Senior Analytic Service, a career track that enables CIA analysts to rise to senior rank without working in management. He also founded the Sherman Kent School for Intelligence Analysis, an institution dedicated to teaching the history, mission, and skills of the analytic profession to new CIA employees.

President Bill Clinton designated McLaughlin as the Acting Deputy Director of Central Intelligence on June 28, 2000 and later nominated him for the position. McLaughlin was unanimously confirmed as the Deputy Director of Central Intelligence by the Senate on October 18, 2000. Director of Central Intelligence George J. Tenet swore in McLaughlin as the Deputy Director of Central Intelligence on October 19, 2000.

After Tenet's resignation on June 3, 2004, the Bush Administration announced that McLaughlin would serve as Acting Director after Tenet's departure on July 11, 2004. McLaughlin himself stepped down as Acting Director on September 24, 2004, after Porter J. Goss was confirmed by the Senate to serve as the new director. He then returned to his position as Deputy Director, and announced his retirement on November 12, 2004.

McLaughlin currently serves as a Senior Fellow and Distinguished Practitioner-in-Residence at the Philip Merrill Center for Strategic Studies at the Johns Hopkins University Paul H. Nitze School of Advanced International Studies (SAIS) in Washington, D.C. He also serves on the Guiding Coalition of the Project on National Security Reform.

On January 8, 2010, Director of National Intelligence Dennis C. Blair announced that he had appointed McLaughlin to head a group of experts to investigate the December 2009 bombing attempt by alleged terrorist Umar Farouk Abdulmutallab aboard Northwest Airlines Flight 253, and the November 2009 Fort Hood shooting, carried out by Army Maj. Nidal Hasan. The group was tasked with making proposals to remedy weaknesses in intelligence systems and procedures that the incidents exposed.

In October 2020, McLaughlin signed a letter stating the Biden laptop story “has the classic earmarks of a Russian information operation

References

External links

|-

1942 births
Directors of the Central Intelligence Agency
Deputy Directors of the Central Intelligence Agency
Living people
People from McKeesport, Pennsylvania
Paul H. Nitze School of Advanced International Studies alumni
Wittenberg University alumni